Jardim Botânico is an administrative region in the Federal District in Brazil. It is basically a gated communities and private estates. It is considered to be one of the best regions (to live) in the Federal District. The region is located approximately 15 kilometers away (9 miles) from the center of Brasília. The administrative region's name comes from to Brasília's Botanical Garden.

See also
List of administrative regions of the Federal District

References

External links

 Regional Administration of Jardim Botânico website
 Government of the Federal District website

Administrative regions of Federal District (Brazil)